Işıkdere is a village in the Ömerli District of Mardin Province in Turkey. The village is populated by Kurds of the Omerkan tribe and had a population of 52 in 2021.

References 

Villages in Ömerli District
Kurdish settlements in Mardin Province